Title 33 of the United States Code outlines the role of navigable waters in the United States Code.

 —Navigable Waters Generally
 —International Rules for Navigation at Sea
 —Navigation Rules for Harbors, Rivers, and Inland Waters Generally
 —Navigation Rules for Great Lakes and Their Connecting and Tributary Waters
 —Navigation Rules for Red River of the North and Rivers Emptying Into Gulf of Mexico and Tributaries
 —Exemption of Navy Or Coast Guard Vessels from Certain Navigation Rules
 —General Duties of Ship Officers and Owners After Collision or Other Accident
 —Regulations For the Suppression of Piracy
 —Summary Trials For Certain Offenses Against Navigation Laws
 —Protection of Navigable Waters and of Harbor and River Improvements Generally
 —Anchorage Grounds And Harbor Regulations Generally
 —Bridges Over Navigable Waters
 —River and Harbor Improvements Generally
 —Mississippi River Commission
 —California Debris Commission
 —Flood Control
 —Lighthouses
 —National Ocean Survey
 —Longshore and Harbor Workers Compensation
 —Saint Lawrence Seaway
 —Pollution of the Sea by Oil
 —International Regulations for Preventing Collisions at Sea
 —Sea Grant Colleges and Marine Science Development
 —Pollution Control of Navigable Waters
 —Vessel Bridge-To-Bridge Communication
 —Ports and Waterways Safety Program
 —Water Pollution Prevention and Control
 —Ocean Dumping
 —Pollution Casualties on the High Seas: United States Intervention
 —Deepwater Ports
 —International Regulations for Preventing Collisions at Sea
 —Ocean Pollution Research and Development and Monitoring Planning
 —Inland Waterways Trust Fund
 —Prevention of Pollution from Ships
 —Inland Navigational Rules
 —Artificial Reefs
 —Water Resources Development
 —Organotin Antifouling Paint Control
 —Dumping of Medical Waste by Public Vessels
 —Shore Protection from Municipal or Commercial Waste
 —Oil Pollution
 —National Coastal Monitoring
 —Estuary Restoration
 —National Oceanic and Atmospheric Administration Commissioned Officer Corps
 —Oceans and Human Health

External links
U.S. Code Title 33, via United States Government Printing Office
U.S. Code Title 33, via Cornell University

33
Title 33